Pikes Arm (alternatively "Pike's Arm") is a fishing community located on New World Island in Newfoundland and Labrador, Canada. It is a few minutes outside Cobb's Arm and about 15 minutes from Twillingate.

See also
 List of communities in Newfoundland and Labrador

Populated coastal places in Canada
Populated places in Newfoundland and Labrador